Inverkeithing Hillfield Swifts Football Club are a Scottish football club based at Dalgety Bay Sports centre  in the town of Dalgety Bay, Fife.

The club was founded in 1996 as Inverkeithing Boys Club, before changing their name to Inverkeithing Blue Brazil a year later. Their current name was adopted in 2000.

For the 2021–22 season, the senior team is playing matches at Dalgety Bay Sports & Leisure Centre in the neighbouring town of Dalgety Bay.

See also
Inverkeithing United

References

External links
 Club website
 
 

Football clubs in Scotland
East of Scotland Football League teams
Football clubs in Fife
Association football clubs established in 1996
1996 establishments in Scotland
Inverkeithing
Dalgety Bay